Joseph Hibbert (died June 15, 2013) was a Jamaican politician. He was MP for St. Andrew East Rural (2002–2011), and the Minister for Transport and Works.

Death
Hibbert died of a heart attack on June 15, 2013 at the age of 65.

References

2013 deaths
Members of the House of Representatives of Jamaica
1940s births
Government ministers of Jamaica